The Cathedral of the Assumption of the Virgin (Uspenskij kafedral'nyj sobor) or more properly the Cathedral of the Dormition of the Mother of God is the Russian Orthodox cathedral  of the diocese of Tashkent in Uzbekistan since 1945. The cathedral was built in 1871 and enlarged in the 1990s, the bell tower was rebuilt in 2010.

The present building was built in 1871 and was dedicated to St. Panteleimon. An old church cemetery was replaced in the service of the Military Hospital of Tashkent. Like most parishes in Central Asia, the church was assigned in 1922 to the Living Church movement, which was promoted by the Bolsheviks. It was closed for worship in 1933 and in 1945 became a military depot.

The church was restored and reopened for worship in December 1945. It was then devoted to Dormition, and became the seat of the Bishop of Tashkent.

The bell tower was rebuilt in the 1990s, next to the main dome. The interior was redecorated with more pomp, especially for the visit on 10 November 1996 by Patriarch Alexis II. The cathedral was remodeled and a new bell tower built in the spring of 2010.

See also

Russian Orthodox Church in Uzbekistan
Eastern Orthodoxy in Uzbekistan
Assumption Cathedral (disambiguation), other cathedrals with the same dedication

References

Cathedrals in Uzbekistan
Churches in Tashkent
Buildings and structures in Tashkent
Churches completed in 1871
Eastern Orthodoxy in Uzbekistan